Andy's Dinosaur Adventures is a television series broadcast in 2014 on CBeebies starring Andy Day. Andy's Dinosaur Adventures is the second series of Andy's Adventures. It was preceded by Andy's Wild Adventures and followed by Andy's Prehistoric Adventures.

Premise 

Andy's Dinosaur Adventures is a BBC dinosaur history series for children. It stars Andy Day as the main character (Andy) who works at the National Museum of the United Kingdom with his co-worker Hatty (Kate Copeland). They work hard to get the museum ready for visitors who are always shown to be children. In each episode, they are shown preparing the newest exhibition before the museum opens and each time a mishap occurs that threatens to delay the opening of the exhibition or to leave the exhibition without a proper display. At this precise moment, the Museum's grandfather clock, which has the ability to go back in time, starts to chime. Andy knows this secret and runs to the clock to go back to the time of the dinosaurs to retrieve whatever is needed for the exhibition. As Day Left to see dinosaur, he gets back to the clock of the time, Day says: "Time to head back!"

The series premiered on 15 February 2014 and are available on Xfinity CBeebies networks.

Episodes

References 

2010s British children's television series
2014 British television series debuts
2014 British television series endings
British preschool education television series
2010s preschool education television series
Television series by BBC Studios
CBeebies